Anzat-le-Luguet is a commune in the Puy-de-Dôme department in Auvergne-Rhône-Alpes in central France. It is in the canton of Brassac-les-Mines.

Administration 
 2008–2014: Rémi Vigier
 2014–current (as of May 2022): Emmanuel Correia

Population

See also
Communes of the Puy-de-Dôme department

References

Communes of Puy-de-Dôme